Jacula is the title character of an Italian eponymous erotic-horror fumetti series.

History 
The character first appeared in a supporting role in the comic series Isabella.

A total of 327 issues of Jacula were produced between 1969 and 1982. Reissues of stories were published between 1973 and 1984 in the series Jacula Collezione.

Plot 
In common with Zora and Sukia, the series contained strong sexual imagery: together with her vampire husband Carlo Verdier, the predatory Jacula seduced the unwary and corrupted the innocent. She was also married to a human called Torlin Novak, and the relationship resulted in a child whose soul was promptly pledged to Satan.

References

Jacula (fumetti)
Jacula (fumetti)
1969 comics debuts
1982 comics endings
Vampires in comics
Erotic comics
Italian comics characters
Female characters in comics
Comics about women
Comics characters introduced in 1969